Nemenčinė ( is a city in Vilnius district municipality, Lithuania, it is located only about  north-east of Vilnius. Close to Nemenčinė forest was planted which forms a sentence Žalgiris 600 (commemorating the Battle of Grunwald) visible from the air.

Names
Nemenčinė is the original name of the city reflected in historical documents and still in use today. It derives from a Lithuanian word referring to the river Nemenčia. Other versions of the name include  Niemenczyn in Polish, Неменчын in Belarusian, Неменчине (or Нямянчине) in Russian, Nementschine in German and Nementchin (נעמענטשין) in Yiddish.

History

Lithuanian wooden castle and the mound stood in Nemenčinė in 10-14th centuries. The settlement started to grow around the castle.  In 1387, following the Christianization of Lithuania, Jogaila established the first Christian parish in Nemenčinė and built a church there. In a 1434 document Andrius Sakaitis, one of the most influential Lithuanian nobleman families during the reign of Grand Duke of Lithuania Casimir IV Jagiellon, listed Nemenčinė as his domain. In 1554, Nemenčinė after the Volok Reform got the rights of the town.

In 1613, the town was marked on the map of the Grand Duchy of Lithuania – Magni Ducatus Lithuaniae, et Regionum Adiacentium exacta Descriptio printed in Amsterdam and financed by the Lithuanian magnate Mikalojus Kristupas Radvila Našlaitėlis.

On 20 September 1941, 403 Jews from the town were massacred in a mass execution. 128 men, 186 women and 99 children were shot by an Einsatzgruppen of local Nazi collaborators. In 1971, a monument was erected on the execution site.

Ethnic composition 
The ethnic composition of Nemenčinė is as follows:

Total population in 2011 – 5054
 Poles 56,5% (2858)
 Lithuanians 27,1% (1368)
 Russians 9,2% (463)
 Belarusians 3,6% (183)
 Ukrainians 0,9% (43)
 Others 2,4% (120)

Total population in 2021 – 4831
 Poles 55,7% (2690)
 Lithuanians 29,1% (1407)
 Russians 8,1% (391)
 Belarusians 2,9% (138)
 Ukrainians 0,8% (38)
 Others 3,3% (160)

International partnership

Nemenčinė is twinned with three towns in Poland: Węgorzewo (Ungura), Ełk (Lukas) and Suwałki (Suvalkai). It also has a partnership agreement with Poland's West Pomeranian Voivodeship, signed in Vilnius on 19 June 2009.

Sports 
In 14 of September 2017 Nemenčinė Biathlon Stadium was opened and become a second operating Biathlon course in Lithuania (first being Ignalina Winter Sports Centre).

People 
 Zdzisław Balicki, Polish Sejm deputy
 Miroslava Ritskiavitchius, Lithuanian handball player that represented Germany at 1996 Olympics

References

External links

 Virtual Tour of Nemenčinė

Cities in Lithuania
Cities in Vilnius County
Vilensky Uyezd
Wilno Voivodeship (1926–1939)
Holocaust locations in Lithuania
Vilnius District Municipality